Megachile occidentalis is a species of bee in the family Megachilidae. It was described by Fox in 1894.

References

Occidentalis
Insects described in 1894